The Men's junior road race of the 2012 UCI Road World Championships was a cycling event that took place on 21 September 2012 in Limburg, the Netherlands.

Final classification

References 

Men's junior road race
UCI Road World Championships – Men's junior road race